Utricularia sect. Polypompholyx is a section in the genus Utricularia that was considered to be its own genus in the family Lentibulariaceae but was reduced to sectional rank by Peter Taylor.

See also 
 List of Utricularia species

References 

Utricularia
Plant sections